Ted Ansani is an American musician who is most known as the bassist/vocalist of 1990s power pop group Material Issue.

Career 
The Chicago-based band Material Issue released four studio albums, but ceased working shortly after frontman Jim Ellison's suicide.

Following Ellison's suicide and the subsequent release of Material Issue's final album, Telecommando Americano, Ansani toured for a year with Chicago band Teenage Frames from 1997–1998. During that time, he also worked with Material Issue drummer Mike Zelenko playing with the bands Slink Moss and Hummer. In 2000, Ansani returned to record on Teenage Frames' 5 song EP, Kingsize Sessions.

In 2000, Ansani released his own solo EP called Throttle and Pistons - The Ted Ansani Project.

Ted Ansani continues to work in the music business in Chicago; he has made several live appearances in the last few years in and around Chicago and has also played the IPO festival when it has come to Chicago.

Ansani currently performs in the Chicago area with bands Diving for Dynamite, Legendary Rockstars, and the "Ted Ansani Project".

Personal life 
Ansani is married with three children and resides in Park Ridge, Illinois.

Further reading

 "International Pop Overthrow (Revised Edition): An Ode to the Golden Triangle of Power Pop - Material Issue" by Jim Hoffmann, Susquehanna Road Publishing, 2015, 774 pps.

References

20th-century American singers
Living people
People from Park Ridge, Illinois
Year of birth missing (living people)
20th-century American male singers